Boyaval is a commune in the Pas-de-Calais department in the Hauts-de-France region in northern France.

Geography
A farming village located 25 miles (40 km) northwest of Arras on the D71 road.

Population

Sights
 The church of St. André, dating from the twentieth century.
 The chateau, dating from the eighteenth century.

See also
Communes of the Pas-de-Calais department

References

Communes of Pas-de-Calais